Genoplesium plumosum, commonly known as the Tallong midge-orchid or plumed midge-orchid, is a species of orchid endemic to New South Wales. It is a small orchid only known from a few sites near the towns of Tallong and Wingello on the Southern Tablelands and is only relatively easy to find for about a month, when it flowers. It has been classified as "Endangered" under the EPBC Act.

Description
Genoplesium plumosum is a terrestrial, perennial, deciduous, sympodial herb, usually with a few inconspicuous, fine roots and a pair of more or less spherical tubers. The tubers are partly covered by a protective fibrous sheath which extends to the soil surface. There is a single cylindrical, glabrous leaf fused to the flowering stem. The leaf of flowering plants is solid but the leaves on plants without flowers are hollow.

The flowers are more or less pendulous, moderately crowded, greenish with purple stripes and have a purplish-red labellum. The callus is narrow egg-shaped to lance-shaped and extends nearly to the tip of the labellum. Flowering usually occurs 4 to 6 weeks following summer or autumn rainfall. The fruit is a non-fleshy, dehiscent capsule containing hundreds of seeds.

Taxonomy and naming
The first formal description of Prasophyllum plumosum was by Herman Rupp in 1942 from a specimen found near Kurnell and the description was published in The Victorian Naturalist. In 1989, David Jones and Mark Clements placed it and most other species of Prasophyllum into Genoplesium. In 2002 Jones and Clements have proposed moving all but one of Genoplesium back to Corunastylis but the move has not been widely accepted.

The specific epithet (plumosum) is a Latin word meaning "feathered".

Distribution and habitat
Tallong midge-orchid grows among low shrubs in forest and in moss gardens over sandstone mainly between Sydney Harbour and Marulan.

Conservation
The main reasons for its decline have been land clearing and grazing by the introduced European Rabbit (Oryctolagus cuniculus). The species is now listed as "Critically Endangered" in terms of the EPBC Act.

References

External links
 

plumosum
Orchids of New South Wales
Endemic orchids of Australia
Plants described in 1942